Carex haydeniana is a species of sedge known by the common name cloud sedge.

It is native to western North America from British Columbia and Alberta south to California and New Mexico. It grows in moist, rocky areas in subalpine and alpine climates.

Description
Carex haydeniana produces clumps of drooping to decumbent stems up to 30 or 40 centimeters long, often much shorter. There are a few flat leaves per stem, each up to about 16 centimeters long.

The inflorescence is a dense dark brown spherical cluster of indistinct spikelets.

External links
Calflora: Carex haydeniana
Jepson Manual Treatment
Flora of North America
Photo gallery

haydeniana
Flora of the Northwestern United States
Flora of the Southwestern United States
Flora of Western Canada
Flora of California
Flora of New Mexico
Plants described in 1871
Taxa named by Stephen Thayer Olney
Flora without expected TNC conservation status